Gemmula grandigyrata is a species of sea snail, a marine gastropod mollusc in the family Turridae, the turrids.

Description
The length of the shell attains 8.2 mm.

Distribution

References

 Li B. [Baoquan] & Li X. [Xinzheng]. (2008). Report on the turrid genera Gemmula, Lophiotoma and Ptychosyrinx (Gastropoda: Turridae: Turrinae) from the China seas. Zootaxa. 1778: 1-25.
 Liu J.Y. [Ruiyu] (ed.). (2008). Checklist of marine biota of China seas. China Science Press. 1267 pp.

External links
 Biolib.cz: Gemmula grandigyrata

grandigyrata
Gastropods described in 2008